These are the Canadian number-one country songs of 1968, per the RPM Country Tracks chart.

See also
1968 in music

References

External links
 Read about RPM Magazine at the AV Trust
 Search RPM charts here at Library and Archives Canada

1968 in Canadian music
Country
1968